Qannat (also Romanized as Qannāt and Qanāt; also known as Ghanat and Qanād) is a village in Tasuj Rural District, in the Central District of Kavar County, Fars Province, Iran. At the 2006 census, its population was 608, in 147 families.

References 

Populated places in Kavar County